Restrepia lansbergii Hook. is a synonym of Restrepia muscifera.

Restrepia lansbergii is a species of orchid found from northwestern Venezuela to north-central Peru.

lansbergii